Travis Holmes (born May 9, 1986) is an American former professional basketball player who last played for Surrey United of the British Basketball League (BBL). He played college basketball for the Virginia Military Institute Keydets basketball program. He was named to the 2009 Second Team All-Big South Conference.

High school career

Travis and his twin brother, Chavis, began playing high school basketball at Vance High School in Charlotte. The team won the 2002–03 North Carolina state championship. Holmes played the 2003–04 and 2004–05 seasons at Christ School in Arden, North Carolina. In his senior season, Holmes averaged 19.7 points, 6.0 rebounds, 3.3 assists and 3.0 steals a game. He was awarded Piedmont Athletic Conference of Independent Schools Most Valuable Player in 2005 and his team won the state championship that same year.

College career

In 2005, Travis and his brother became the third set of twins to play basketball at the Virginia Military Institute. In his sophomore season Holmes led the nation in steals with 111 while averaging 3.4 steals a game. He set a school record with 11 steals in one game against Bridgewater. Holmes' strong defensive play earned him a spot on the 2007 All-Big South Tournament Team. In his senior season Holmes earned Second Team All-Big South Conference honors and a spot on the Richmond Times-Dispatch All-State Team. In 2009 the Holmes brothers became the NCAA's all-time leading scoring twins.

See also
 List of NCAA Division I men's basketball players with 11 or more steals in a game
 List of NCAA Division I men's basketball season steals leaders

References

External links
 Travis Holmes at draftexpress.com
 Travis Holmes at eurobasket.com
 Travis Holmes at sports-reference.com
Úrvalsdeild stats at kki.is

1986 births
Living people
American expatriate basketball people in Iceland
American expatriate basketball people in Israel
American expatriate basketball people in the United Kingdom
Basketball players from Charlotte, North Carolina
Shooting guards
VMI Keydets basketball players
Christ School (North Carolina) alumni
Úrvalsdeild karla (basketball) players
Njarðvík men's basketball players
American men's basketball players